The vice president of Kyrgyzstan was a political position in the government of Kyrgyzstan created in December 1990. The position was abolished in 1993.

The Vice President was charged with assuming the duties of the president should the president be unable to perform them. Under article 50 of the 2007 constitution, the Prime Minister now bears that responsibility.

Office holders

See also
List of leaders of Kyrgyzstan
President of Kyrgyzstan
Prime Minister of Kyrgyzstan

References

Politics of Kyrgyzstan
Government of Kyrgyzstan
Vice presidents of Kyrgyzstan
Kyrgyzstan
1990 establishments in the Kirghiz Soviet Socialist Republic
1993 disestablishments in Kyrgyzstan